Engenho de Dentro is a middle-class and lower-middle-class neighbourhood in the North Zone of Rio de Janeiro, Brazil. It borders the neighbourhoods of Abolição, Água Santa, Cachambi, Encantado, Inhaúma, Lins de Vasconcelos, Méier, Pilares and Todos os Santos. The Nilton Santos Olympic Stadium, home stadium of Botafogo F.R. and one of the venues of the 2007 Pan American Games, 2016 Summer Olympics and Paralympics, is situated in Engenho de Dentro.

References

Neighbourhoods in Rio de Janeiro (city)